The first season of Love Games: Bad Girls Need Love Too premiered on March 16, 2010, after the  fourth season Bad Girls Club reunion. It is the second spin-off to Bad Girls Club. The first season ran for eight episodes and is hosted by Bret Ernst.

Format
Alumni from previous seasons of Bad Girls Club are "looking for the man of their dreams." It takes place in one of the original "Bad Girl" houses used to film previous seasons. Three "bad girls" have a choice of 13 bachelors to explore love, friendships, etc. Competing in love games with thirteen eligible bachelors to find their perfect match and prove they are the best of the bunch. Each weeks  features a variety of challenges and group dates. As the show goes on, the dates become more solo while the girls "pick the man of their dreams."

Premise
Love Games features three former "bad girls" from Bad Girls Club— Amber Meade and Sarah Michaels, both of season three, and Kendra James of season four.  The show revolves around the three girls trying to find the right man out of thirteen bachelors. Each week features challenges for the bachelors and group dates.  Bret Ernst hosts the eight one-hour episode season.  It premiered after The Bad Girls Club's season four first two-part reunion special on March 16, 2010, at 11 p.m. ET/PT, but moved to its regular timeslot on March 30 at 10 p.m. ET/PT. The season finale aired on May 4, 2010.

Cast

"Bad Girls"

Contestants

Elimination Chart

Notes

Episodes

References

External links
 

2010 American television seasons